Club Aurora is a football club from Cochabamba, Bolivia, that plays in the División de Fútbol Profesional, the top tier of Bolivian football. The club was founded May 27, 1935, and plays its home games at the Estadio Félix Capriles.

Achievements

National honours
First Division – Professional Era: 2
1963, 2008-C
Runners-up (4): 1960, 1961, 1964, 2004-A

Copa Simón Bolívar: 2
2002, 2016–17
Runners-up (1): (2000)

Copa Aerosur:
Runners-up (2): 2004, 2011

Performance in CONMEBOL competitions
Copa Libertadores: 2 appearances
1964 – First Round
2009 – First Round

Copa Sudamericana: 4 appearances
2004 – Preliminary Round
2011 – Round of 16
2012 – Second Round
2015 – First Round

Current squad

Managers
 Mario Ortega
 Julio César Baldivieso (July 1, 2008 – July 24, 2009), (April 2, 2011 – Nov 2, 2011)
 Jorge Habegger (Jan 5, 2012 – Feb 13, 2012)
 Julio César Baldivieso (June 20, 2012 – Dec 31, 2012)
 Victor Hugo Antelo (March 14, 2013 – Sept 30, 2013)
 Miguel Ángel Zahzú (Jan 7, 2014 – July 7, 2014)
 David Torrico (Aug 1,2014 –  Oct 11, 2014)
 Luis Manuel Blanco (Oct 13, 2014)
 Marcelo Claros (Feb 3, 2015 )
 Julio Fuentes (June 8, 2019 – )

External links

Club website

 
Association football clubs established in 1935
Aurora
1935 establishments in Bolivia